Sailing at the 2012 Summer Olympics in London was held 29 July – 11 August 2012 at Weymouth and Portland National Sailing Academy in Weymouth. The 2012 sailing program consisted of a total of ten events (eight classes). Eleven fleet races were scheduled off the coast at Weymouth Bay for each event, except for the 49er and the Elliott 6m classes. For the 49er class, a total of 16 races were scheduled. Of the 11 (16) races, 10 (15) were scheduled as opening races and the last one as medal race. For the Elliott 6m a series of match races was scheduled. The sailing was done on different types of courses.

Venue 

According to the IOC statutes the contests in all sport disciplines must be held either in, or as close as possible to the city which the IOC has chosen. Among others, an exception is made for the Olympic sailing events, which customarily must be staged on the open sea. On account of this principle, Weymouth and Portland was selected for the honor to carry out the Olympic yachting regattas. For that purpose the Weymouth and Portland National Sailing Academy was reconstructed.

Weymouth and Portland National Sailing Academy (WPNSA) 

The land based part of the WPNSA includes: 
 Administrative and game management center
 Media center
 The "Hangar" for measurement, social events and logistic center.
 (Inter)National sailing center
 Craning, mooring and slipway facilities

Course areas 
A total of five race areas were set on Weymouth Bay of the coast of the Weymouth and Portland National Sailing Academy. The exclusion area was limited by a fictive line between Portland and the mainland. All racing took place within this exclusion zone. The five course areas were positioned according to the table below the map but could be moved anywhere within the exclusion zone.

Competition

Qualification 

Fifty-seven nations qualified for the sailing events and a further six were allocated places not taken up by qualified nations to give a total of 63 nations participating. The only countries to have qualified in all events were France, New Zealand, the USA and the hosts, Great Britain; New Zealand declined to take up their place in the Women's RS-X.

Overview

Continents 
 Africa
 Asia
 Oceania
 Europe
 North America
 South America

Countries

Classes (equipment)

Race schedule

Medal summary

Men's events

Women's events

Medal table

Further reading

References

External links 

 
 
 

 
2012 Summer Olympics events
2012
2012 in sailing
Sport in Dorset
Sailing competitions in the United Kingdom